Public Order Act (with its variations) is a stock short title used for legislation in Malaysia, Rhodesia, Sierra Leone, Hong Kong, Singapore, the Republic of Ireland and the United Kingdom, relating to public order offences.

List

Hong Kong
The Public Order Ordinance 1967, an Act passed following the 1967 riots

Malaysia
The Public Order (Preservation) Act 1958

Republic of Ireland
The Criminal Justice (Public Order) Act, 1994
The Criminal Justice (Public Order) Act 2003

Rhodesia
The Public Order Act 1955, an Act giving the police the power to detain and restrict without trial.

Sierra Leone
The Public Order Act 1965

Singapore
The Public Order Act 2009

United Kingdom
Acts of the Parliament of the United Kingdom:
The Public Order Act 1860
The Public Order Act 1936 (c 6)
The Public Order Act 1963 (c 52)
The Public Order Act 1986 (c 64)
The Criminal Justice and Public Order Act 1994 (c 33)
The Public Order (Amendment) Act 1996 (c 59)

Acts of the Parliament of Northern Ireland:
The Public Order Act (Northern Ireland) 1951
The Public Order (Amendment) Act (Northern Ireland) 1970 (c 4)

The following Orders in Council, passed due to the suspension of home rule in Northern Ireland, are considered to be primary legislation:  
The Public Order (Northern Ireland) Order 1987 (S.I. 1987/463 (N.I. 7))
The Public Order (Amendment) (Northern Ireland) Order 1997 (S.I. 1997/1181 (N.I. 10))

Act of the Scottish Parliament:

The Police, Public Order and Criminal Justice (Scotland) Act 2006 (asp 10)

See also
List of short titles
Riot Acts

References

Lists of legislation by short title